Pool A of the First Round of the 2006 World Baseball Classic was held at Tokyo Dome, Tokyo, Japan from March 3 to 5, 2006.

Pool A was a round-robin tournament. Each team played the other three teams once, with the top two teams advancing to Pool 1.

Standings

Results
All times are Japan Standard Time (UTC+09:00).

South Korea 2, Chinese Taipei 0

Japan 18, China 2

South Korea 10, China 1

Japan 14, Chinese Taipei 3

Chinese Taipei 12, China 3

South Korea 3, Japan 2

External links
Official website

Pool A
World Baseball Classic Pool A
World Baseball Classic Pool A
International baseball competitions hosted by Japan
World Baseball Classic Pool A
Sports competitions in Tokyo